R600 may refer to:

 Radeon R600, a unified shader architecture and Direct3D 10 graphics processing unit developed by ATI
 R600 road (Ireland), a regional road in Ireland
 R600 road (South Africa), a Regional Route in South Africa
 Ericsson R600, a mobile phone by Ericsson

See also
 R-600A, the refrigerant isobutane